Danny Lorenz (born December 12, 1969) is a Canadian former professional ice hockey goaltender. He was drafted in the third round of the 1988 NHL Entry Draft and played in eight National Hockey League games for the New York Islanders from 1990 to 1993. The rest of his career, which lasted from 1989 to 2004, was mainly spent in various minor leagues. After his playing career Lorenz became a youth hockey director of the Kent Valley Hockey Association in Kent, Washington. He was replaced as head coach of the  Seattle Ravens in the Northern Pacific Hockey League by Adam Kurtenbach in 2016.

Career statistics

Regular season and playoffs

Awards
 WHL West First All-Star Team – 1989 & 1990

References

External links
 

1969 births
Living people
Adler Mannheim players
Canadian ice hockey goaltenders
Capital District Islanders players
Cincinnati Cyclones (IHL) players
Coventry Blaze players
Houston Aeros (1994–2013) players
Ice hockey people from British Columbia
Milwaukee Admirals (IHL) players
New Mexico Scorpions players
New York Islanders draft picks
New York Islanders players
Newcastle Vipers players
Nottingham Panthers players
People from Langley, British Columbia (district municipality)
Richmond Renegades players
Rochester Americans
Salt Lake Golden Eagles (IHL) players
Seattle Thunderbirds players
Springfield Indians players
Tacoma Sabercats players
Tallahassee Tiger Sharks players